T-comma (majuscule: Ț, minuscule: ț) is a letter which is part of the Romanian alphabet, used to represent the Romanian language sound , the voiceless alveolar affricate (like the letter C in Slavic languages that use the Latin alphabet). It is written as the letter T with a small comma below and it has both the lower-case (U+021B) and the upper-case variants (U+021A).

Software support 
T-comma was not part of the early Unicode versions, it was introduced only in Unicode 3.0.0 (September 1999) at the request of the Romanian national standardization body. Thus, some legacy systems do not have fonts compatible with it, for example Microsoft's Windows XP require installing the European Union Expansion Font Update. Full support of this letter has been available on Macintosh computer since Mac OS X and on PC since Windows Vista. Although accessibility issues are a concern only on legacy systems, because of inertia and/or ignorance some newly-produced Romanian texts still use Ţ (T-cedilla, available from Unicode version 1.1.0, June 1993).

The letter is placed in Unicode in the Latin Extended-B range, under "Additions for Romanian", as the "Latin capital letter T with comma below" (U+021A) and "Latin small letter t with comma below" (U+021B). In HTML these can be encoded by &#x021a; and &#x021b;, respectively.

In Windows XP, most of the fonts including the Arial Unicode MS render T-cedilla as T-comma because T-cedilla was not believed to be used in any language. (It is in fact used, but in very few languages. T with Cedilla exists as part of the General Alphabet of Cameroon Languages, in some Gagauz orthographies, in the Kabyle dialect of the Berber language, and possibly elsewhere.) Technically, this is incorrect as a mismatching glyph is associated with a certain character code. Therefore, text written using S-cedilla and T-cedilla can often be seen as if it had been written using S-comma and T-comma. However, in order to correctly encode and render both S-comma and T-comma, one has to install the European Union Expansion Font Update. There is no official way to add keyboard support for these characters. In order to type them, one has to either install 3rd party keyboards, or use the Character Map.

The Windows version of the Firefox web browser is able to generate S-comma and T-comma, even if the characters are missing from the system's fonts. Internet Explorer does not have this capability.

All Linux distributions are able to correctly render S-comma and T-comma, since at least 2005. If these characters are missing from a certain font, they will be substituted with the glyph from another font. Although the X.Org Server supports the correct keyboard (ro comma) since at least 2005, selecting this keyboard from the user interface (e.g. GNOME Keyboard Properties) has only recently been made possible.

Character encoding

See also 
T-cedilla (Ţ)
D-comma (D̦)
S-comma (Ș)
Other diacritics confused with the cedilla
C c : Latin letter C

References

External links 
Latin capital letter T with comma below
Latin capital letter T with cedilla
European Union Expansion Font Update
Keyboard driver for Windows XP with S-comma and T-comma

Latin letters with diacritics
Romanian language
1825 introductions